Castle Szidonia, also known as Szidónia Manor House, is a 17th-century castle in Röjtökmuzsaj, Hungary. Nowadays, it operates as a spa hotel.

History 
During the 16th century, the Castle Szidonia estate consisted of a single-story building in a wooden area. In 1750, the castle was rebuilt using a romantic and classical style. The double-winged main building surrounds a large, U-shaped courtyard with pillared arcades. The military park estate originally occupied .

, a member of the Hungarian parliament, inherited the estate after his father, Sándor Nagy of Sopron county died. Following the death of his only daughter, Juliana, the estate was given to her husband, Maximilian Urmenyi. 

Urmenyi's descendants sold the building and left four pieces of bedroom furniture and a life-size portrait of Maria Theresa, which later disappeared. It is said Theresa visited the Ürményi family and that the portrait had been painted in memory of her visit.

In 1910, the estate was bought by Maximilian Berg, a German. Until then, the castle had remained largely unchanged. Berg rebuilt the castle according to military designs by an architect from the Austrian city of Wiener Neustadt. According to an inscription, the garden bridge, featuring two stone lions, was donated in 1923 by the German Thyssen industrial magnate family – today the Thyssen-Bornemisza family.  The sons of Baron Maximilian inherited the castle.

In 1926, the Hungarian ambassador to the Vatican, Verseghy Elek Nagy, and his wife, Johanna Elizabeth Janssen, became the new owners. They extensively reconstructed and modernized the castle. During their ownership, the park around the castle was built and a large pool was constructed by swimmer and architect Alfréd Hajós. Janssen's tastes are reflected in the estate's design. The park's pool area contains a small wooden Japanese house, which was unprecedented in the region. The courtyard is in the style of a French garden, with round trees, and hedges and flowers planted in a double square. The southern face of the wall also has an enclosed garden with an area of 2,500 square metres, with a small pool and fountain in the middle.

World War II 
Upon entering the building, visitors can see historical wooden tiles and a plaster ceiling in the lobby, as well as a marble fireplace which remained intact during World War II. In the chapel there is a high-quality copy of the work of Italian painter and inventor Leonardo da Vinci, Madonna Litta, whose original is exhibited in the Hermitage Museum in Saint Petersburg, Russia. On either side of the altar were 17th-century wooden statues, which are now exhibited in the Christian Museum in Sopron, portraying the Apostle Paul and the holy bishop. The identity of the artist who produced these works is unknown.

The salon floor furniture comes from the Amsterdam palace of Louis Bonaparte, brother of Napoleon. The furniture is from a Dutch lady's estate. After her death, it was inherited by her daughter, the first wife of Verseghy Elek, Johanna Elizabeth Janssen, the granddaughter of the highly successful global tradesman and philanthropist,  of Amsterdam. In this way, the former royal salon furniture came to Röjtökmuzsaj.

The Verseghy family crypt is located in the castle park Verseghy. The father of Elek Nagy, Francis, was buried there in 1928. Elek Nagy Verseghy's wife died in 1934, aged 34 years, and is buried in the family crypt. Elek and Elizabeth left behind six small children; Francis Xavier, Edith, Magdalena, Alexa, Peter (who died in WWII), Maria Louisa and Elizabeth. 

Verseghy Elek Nagy remarried Mary Louise Countess Zichy in 1936, with whom he had two sons, Andrew and Elek.

Verseghy Elek Nagy and his wife were deported in 1951 to Tiszasüly – Kolop Tanya.

Post-communism 
In 1997, Derry Márta bought the castle and renovated the historic structure despite its poor condition. The preparatory work for the surveying and design took place from February to August 1998, and construction from September 1998 to December 1999. The interior work began in parallel with the construction work from September to December 1999. The property was then opened to the public on New Year's Eve.

The renovations prioritized the preserving as much of the old manor buildings as possible. Due to an increased number of hotel guests, new stairs were developed along the two side wings, raised roofs, and attic.

The ground floor was expanded with a glazed veranda conservatory and converted into a restaurant. The largest intervention in the build-wing swimming pool this meant, but tried not to disturb the harmony of the castle. The backyard maintained and developed while the current premises of the sauna and nice varied. The swimming pool with a glass polygonal shape is not only the park is trying to close a connection, but also refers to the development of the main entrance façade of glazed conservatory as well.

Organically linked to the castle within the castle garden L-shaped farm building, which has been managed by the council, after the nationalization. It worked inside the youth club, village library, hair salon, organized by the place where the village celebrations and gatherings. It was a popular place. The government would have liked, but he could not sacrifice the order imports. Thus, was born the idea that the new owners of the castle undertake the renovation of the farm building, which historically has always belonged to the castle anyway, so that the castle and its environment in all its glory as a hotel to work on. How the community is not exposed to harm, instead they built a place designated by the government of a new, more suitable for today's needs of the village house, which has not only events venue, but also the permanent home of the local government.

The exchange took place, so that became the village built a new house is proof that good cause to private owners and municipalities can cooperate benefit everyone.

The former economic building of what is now called the Udvarhaz, increased the attic floor area, making sure, however, that the new building mass should not be too pronounced. There, 13 rooms were built.

The Japanese house and external ponds at the castle were restored to their original form.

The castle is surrounded by a  park that diversity, well-known works are here to impress, but opportunities for active recreation.

The "Wizard again," Mary Brány chartered civil engineer garden landscape and thus evokes the atmosphere of the garden. "It seemed unlikely to intact existing Dutch bukszusparterekkel articulated and bokorrózsákkal planted garden, based on the plans of Alfred Hajos outdoor pool, a Japanese house, the former owner Verseghy Nagy Elek vault, the vadgesztenyékkel tree-lined walking paths and opens me up."

The garden structure, which once built the Berlin Verseghy Nagy Elek Späth execution of the company, has not changed over the years. The sculptural work, however, was the work of the team in Sopron also Geza Seiffert, Baumann Bela Bela Mechle and personally.

The former park and creation of the atmosphere of the newly built sports fields did not change.

"Export plan for the renovation of the park ahead of preparatory work was more part of the park geodetic survey and inventory of existing crops. Due to the from a hotel function the garden must meet diverse needs that had to be taken into account in the design. The value of existing plants and the former from design remaining protected items matching the features I was looking for the opportunity to provide new housing needs in such a way that the final result of building a harmonious ensemble park in relation born. "- Mary says Brány.

Not much is known about the original grounds, but the Dutch garden and the U-shaped inner garden were left intact, with plane trees and a black walnut.

In January 2014, Professor Dr. Günter Nebel, the hotel's new owner, who is trying to preserve the character of the hotel is developed and adjusted to the concept, and the hospitality at, which has always been home waiting for the visitor.

Hotel  
The castle belongs to the Austrian and the Hungarian Castle Alliance. It was first used as a hunting lodge, and has since been converted into a 46-room hotel.

The hotel was awarded the Castle Hotel of the Year in 2007.

References 

Hotels in Hungary